Whiteout, in comics, may refer to:

 Whiteout (Marvel Comics), a Marvel Comics character from the Savage Land
 Whiteout (Oni Press), a series from Oni Press, written by Greg Rucka and adapted into a film released in 2009
 Whiteout: Melt, a sequel also by Greg Rucka
 Whyteout, a Marvel Comics character who appeared in Thunderstrike

See also
Whiteout (disambiguation)